The Dr. A. G. Anderson House is a historic house located at the junction of Duncan and Main Streets in Eudora, Arkansas.

Description and history 
It is a single-story vernacular T-shaped central hall cottage, built in 1901 for Dr. A. G. Anderson by hired African-American labor. The house has board-and-batten walls, and was constructed of cypress and pine. The roof, originally clad in wood shingles, was for many years covered in tin, but restoration work done in the 1990s returned the roof to wood shingling. The front facade has a full-width porch with a shed roof. The building is distinctive as an early wood-frame house set in an area now filled with brick commercial construction.

The house was listed on the National Register of Historic Places on July 24, 1992.

See also
National Register of Historic Places listings in Chicot County, Arkansas

References

Houses on the National Register of Historic Places in Arkansas
Houses completed in 1901
Houses in Chicot County, Arkansas
National Register of Historic Places in Chicot County, Arkansas
Eudora, Arkansas